Piedmont Authority for Regional Transportation (PART) provides inter-city and regional public transportation for the Greensboro, Winston-Salem and High Point, NC combined statistical area, known as the Piedmont Triad area.

Member Counties 
Alamance
Davie
Davidson
Forsyth
Guilford
Randolph
Rockingham
Stokes
Surry
Yadkin

History 
In the winter of 1989 the City Managers, Transportation Advisory Committee Chairpersons and the Directors of Transportation for the Cities of Greensboro, High Point and Winston-Salem held a joint meeting to discuss transportation related issues in the Triad Region. It was a known necessity from all represented that better planning needed to occur to improve the transportation systems throughout the Piedmont Triad. A lack of communication and planning at the regional level between districts and divisions of the cities and state respectively had been a contributing factor to congestion and diminishing the quality of life. In the fall of 1993 the NCDOT provided funding of what has been called "phase one study to develop a Regional Transportation Plan."

In the fall of 1995, the Transit 2001 Commission was appointed by Governor Jim Hunt to investigate the future of North Carolina's transit industry.

In the fall of 1996, a second phase of a Regional Transportation Study initiated a meeting of the mayors throughout the Triad and others to discuss the formation of a new Triad Transportation Authority.

In February 1997, the Transit 2001 Commission released its final report. The Transit 2001 report had been regarded as the map for the future of North Carolina's transit industry.

In June 1997, the North Carolina General Assembly passed Article 27, GS160A authorizing the formation of a Regional Transportation Authority in the Triad. The NC General Assembly also appropriated $750,000 to conduct two separate rail corridor studies in the Triad to be administered by the new Regional Transportation Authority. Moreover, in June 1997, authorization for new revenue sources to fund Regional Transportation Programs was established.

In the Fall of 1997, representatives of local governments met to arrange for the formation of a Regional Transportation Authority in the Piedmont Triad.

On October 6, 1998, the Piedmont Authority for Regional Transportation held its inaugural meeting of the Board of Trustees. The PART Board of Trustees has been meeting regularly since the inaugural meeting of 1998. The Board of Trustees have established a work program, adopted a business plan and have increased staff to manage the activities of the Regional Transportation Authority.

In 2012, PART chose National Express Transit as its contractor, after the bankruptcy of previous operator Coach America.

Route list

Weekday Routes

Saturday Routes 

 1 Winston-Salem Express (February 3, 2018)
2 Greensboro Express (February 3, 2018)
3 High Point Express (February 3, 2018)
5 NC Amtrak Connector (April 24, 2004)
20 NW Pleasant Ridge Shuttle (February 3, 2018)
21 NE Chimney Rock Shuttle (February 3, 2018)
22 SW Sandy Ridge Shuttle (February 3, 2018)
23 SE Piedmont Pkwy Shuttle (February 3, 2018)
24 Burgess/Regional Rd (August 3, 2020)

Sunday Routes 

 5 NC Amtrak Connector (April 25, 2004)

References 
2. New bus refresh for August 2020 – Piedmont Authority for Regional Transit. Retrieved June 5, 2021

External links 
 http://www.partnc.org

Bus transportation in North Carolina
Piedmont Triad
1998 establishments in North Carolina